Juglans australis, the nogal criollo, is a species of plant in the Juglandaceae family. It is threatened by habitat loss.

Description
J. australis is a spreading deciduous tree, up to 25 m. wide which produces first quality lumber, with a straight trunk up to 6 m. tall and up to 5 dm. in diameter.  The wood is dense (640 kg/m3), hard, and strong.  Upon drying, the radial shrinkage is 2.2%, the tangential 4.7%.  The pinnately compound leaves are borne alternately, and bear up to fifteen oval-lanceolate finely serrate leaflets.

Like most walnuts, J. australis produces juglone, an allelopathic substance which decreases competition from other plants growing nearby. 

It is more frost resistant than the Persian walnut (J. regia).

Uses
The immature fruits are pickled whole for human consumption. The mature nuts are also eaten. The concentrated extract of the husk is used as a vermifuge.

References

australis
Edible nuts and seeds
Near threatened plants
Taxonomy articles created by Polbot
Plants described in 1879
Flora of the Southern Andean Yungas